Ahora y Siempre may refer to:

 Ahora y Siempre (Alacranes Musical album)
 Ahora y Siempre (La Mafia album)

See also 
 Now and Forever (disambiguation)